Zakrzewek  is a village in the administrative district of Gmina Ostrów Mazowiecka, within Ostrów Mazowiecka County, Masovian Voivodeship, in east-central Poland.
Zakrzewek is the place where Stanislaw Jasiński was born.

References

Zakrzewek